Patricia Mary Greenhalgh  (born 11 March 1959) is a British professor of primary health care and a practising general practitioner.

Early life and education
Greenhalgh attended Folkestone Grammar School. She gained a BA in Social and Political Sciences from the University of Cambridge in 1980. She then qualified in Medicine from the University of Oxford in 1983.

Academic career
In April 2010, Greenhalgh was appointed Professor of Primary Health Care and Dean for Research Impact at Queen Mary University of London. Her role included setting up and leading the Healthcare Innovation and Policy Unit in the Centre for Health Sciences at Barts and the London School of Medicine and Dentistry.

In January 2015, Trish Greenhalgh took up the post of Professor of Primary Care Health Sciences and Fellow of Green Templeton College at the University of Oxford.

In September 2016, she was one of 14 scientists, doctors, and policymakers who signed onto an open letter to Prime Minister UK Theresa May calling for an inquiry into Secretary of State for Health Jeremy Hunt's claim that inadequate weekend staffing at the National Health Service led to avoidable patient deaths.

She is a Senior Investigator at the National Institute for Health and Care Research (NIHR).

She is the author/co-author of more than 580 peer-reviewed publications and 8 textbooks.

How to Read a Paper, her widely-read book on how to assess medical research papers first appeared in 1997. The sixth edition was published in 2019.

Honours and awards
She has twice won the Royal College of General Practitioners Research Paper of the Year Award.

She accepted an OBE in 2001 for services to evidence based medical care.

In 2006, she was one of the authors who received the Baxter Award from the European Health Management Association.

She was elected to become a Fellow of the Academy of Medical Sciences in 2014.

References

External links 

 Twitter
 Google Scholar profile
 Website

Alumni of Clare College, Cambridge
Alumni of University College, Oxford
20th-century English medical doctors
British general practitioners
English women medical doctors
Academics of University College London
Statutory Professors of the University of Oxford
Fellows of the Royal College of Physicians
Fellows of the Royal College of General Practitioners
Fellows of the Academy of Medical Sciences (United Kingdom)
NIHR Senior Investigators
1959 births
Living people
Fellows of Green Templeton College, Oxford
Officers of the Order of the British Empire
20th-century women physicians
20th-century English women